Sadovnichesky Bridge is a cоncrete pedestrian arch bridge that spans Vodootvodny Canal in historical Zamoskvorechye district of Moscow, Russia. The bridge connects Balchug island with Zamoskvorechye mainland. It was built in 1963, designed by Nina  Bragina (structural engineering), V.A. Korchagin and K.P. Savelyev (architectural design). It is Moscow's nearest adaptation of a Moon bridge.

History and specifications

The bridge emerged as a conduit for water pipes; pedestrian walkway is a secondary function. Arches are unusually thick for a bridge of this size due to pipe diameter (75 centimeters); bridge engineers called it Mastodon. 

According to chief engineer, Nina Bragina, prefabricated concrete was chosen under political pressure (in situ concrete would be faster and cheaper). As a result, curved concrete boxed required extensive work and rework at the concrete panel plant. 

The arch is 32.0 meters long, 6.2 meters high and 3.5 meters wide. Each end of the arch is supported by 16 piles, including 4 straight and 12 angled.

See also
List of bridges in Moscow

References
Russian: Носарев В.А., Скрябина, Т.А., "Мосты Москвы", М, "Вече", 2004, стр.89 (Bridges of Moscow, 2004, p. 89) 
Russian: Пухначев, Ю., "Садовнический мост", "Наука и жизнь" N 1, 1976 (Sadovnichesky Bridge) online at mos-nj.narod.ru

Bridges in Moscow
Deck arch bridges
Pedestrian bridges in Russia
Bridges completed in 1963
Bridges built in the Soviet Union
Concrete bridges